Salim Abdul Rashid Khan (born 24 November 1935) is an Indian actor, film producer and screenwriter. As a screenwriter, he wrote the screenplays, stories and scripts for numerous Bollywood films. Khan is one half of the prolific screenwriting duo of Salim–Javed, along with Javed Akhtar. The duo were among the first Indian screenwriters to achieve star status in Hindi cinema, and became the most successful Indian screenwriters of all time. While working together, Salim Khan was largely responsible for developing the stories and characters, while Javed Akhtar was largely responsible for developing the dialogues.

Salim-Javed revolutionised Indian cinema in the 1970s, transforming and reinventing the Bollywood formula, pioneering the Bollywood blockbuster format, and pioneering genres such as the masala film and the Dacoit Western. Salim Khan was also responsible for creating the "angry young man" character archetype of Amitabh Bachchan. Their films are among the highest-grossing Indian films of all time, including Sholay (1975), the highest-grossing Indian film ever at the time, as well as films such as Seeta Aur Geeta (1972), Zanjeer (1973), Deewaar (1975), Kranti (1981), and the Don franchise. Sholay is also considered to be one of the greatest Indian films of all time.

Khan is also known as the founder of the Salim Khan family, as the father of three Bollywood actors, Salman Khan (one of the big three Khans of Bollywood), Sohail Khan, and Arbaaz Khan, and film producer Alvira Khan Agnihotri. He is married to Sushila Charak (a.k.a. Salma Khan) and to actress Helen Richardson Khan. Salim Khan won six Filmfare Awards as part of Salim-Javed, and he was later awarded the Padma Shri in 2014.

Early years 
Salim Khan was born in the city of Balaghat in Indore State a princely state in British India (modern day Madhya Pradesh, India) into an affluent family. Khan's grandparents, are believed to be Alakozai Pashtuns who migrated from Afghanistan to India in the mid-1800s and served in the cavalry of the British Indian Army. According to Jasim Khan in the biography of Salman Khan, his ancestors belonged to the Akuzai sub-tribe of the Yusufzai Pashtuns from Malakand in the Swat valley of North-West Frontier Province, British India (present-day Khyber Pakhtunkhwa, Pakistan). Khan's family tended to look for employment in government service, and eventually settled in Indore.

Salim Khan was the youngest child of his parents, both of whom died by the time he was 14 years old. His father, Abdul Rashid Khan, had joined the Indian Imperial Police and had risen to the rank of DIG-Indore, which was the highest police rank open to an Indian in British India. Salim's mother died when he was only nine years old. She had suffered from tuberculosis for four years before her death, and therefore it was forbidden for the younger children come close to her or hug her; Salim therefore had little contact with his mother even before her early death. His father also died in January 1950, when he was only fourteen years old. Two months later, in March 1950, Salim (who attended St. Raphaels' School in Indore) appeared for his matriculation examination. He did moderately well, and enrolled in Holkar College, Indore, and completed his BA. His elder brothers supported him with funds drawn from the family's substantial wealth, to the extent that he was given a car of his own while he was a college student. He excelled in sports, especially cricket, and it was for being a star cricketer that he was allowed by the college to enroll for a master's degree at the end of his bachelors. He was also a trained pilot. During these years, he also became enamored of films, and received encouragement from classmates, who told him that with his exceptional good looks, he should try to become a film star.

Career

Acting phase (1960–1969) 
Here, he was spotted by film director K. Amarnath, who was impressed by his good looks and offered him a supporting role in his forthcoming film Baraat. He would be paid Rs.1000/- as a signing amount and a monthly salary of Rs.400/- for the period of shooting. Salim accepted and moved to Mumbai, living in a small rented apartment in Mahim. His brother owned transport trucks in indore and helped him with money now and then. While Baraat was duly made and released in 1960, it did not do too well, and in any case, his role was a minor one.

Working under the name Prince Salim, he got into the usual 'struggle' situation of wannabe actors, working in minor roles, being typecast as a good-looking supporting actor, and gradually descending into B-grade films. Over the next decade, he acted in what he calls “indifferent roles," playing minor characters in about two dozen films, but so minor were his appearances that his name does not appear on the credits of several of these films; his credits amount to a total of 14 films until 1970, and one final appearance in 1977. These included Teesri Manzil (1966), Sarhaadi Lootera (1966) and Diwaana (1967). His most substantial role, for which he did receive some notice, was in Teesri Manzil, where his role as the hero's friend was a meaty one, and his entry scene got a very good build-up.

Screenwriting transition (1969–1971) 
After working in 25 films, he eventually understood that he "was not cut out to be an actor because I lacked the art of projection. But by then it was too late — how could I have gone back to Indore?" In the late 1960s, Salim Khan, who was struggling financially, decided to start shifting his focus away from acting and towards writing scripts, and continued to use the name Prince Salim. One of his more notable film scripts was Do Bhai (1969). He also began working with Abrar Alvi as a writing assistant.

Salim-Javed phase (1971–1982) 

Salim met Javed Akhthar for first time during the making of the film Sarhadi Lootera, which was fated to be Salim's last acting appearance. Javed, who served as a clapper boy when shooting began, was later made the dialogue writer for the film by director S.M. Sagar. The friendship with Javed began while both were working in this film, and developed further because their bosses were neighbours to each other. Salim Khan got a job assisting writer/director Abrar Alvi in finalising screenplays and dialogues, while Javed Akhtar began assisting Kaifi Azmi in a similar capacity, with focus on honing poetry. Abrar Alvi and Kaifi Azmi were neighbours, and therefore Salim Khan and Javed Akhtar used to see a lot of each other. The duo hit it off well and formed a script-writing team that came to be known as Salim–Javed. Salim used to form stories and plots, whereas Javed used to develop the dialogues and occasionally the song-lyrics for those films. They used to brainstorm and come to conclusions regarding the final draft of the film.

Rajesh Khanna is credited with giving them their first break as script writers. Javed Akhtar accepted in an interview that "One day, he (Rajesh Khanna) went to Salimsaab and said that Mr. Devar had given him a huge signing amount with which he could complete the payment for his bungalow Aashirwad. But the film was a remake [of Deiva Cheyal] and the script of the original was far from being satisfactory. He told us that if we could set right the script, he would make sure we got both money and credit." This was their first break as script-writers, and the film, Haathi Mere Saathi, went on to become a big hit.
The Salim–Javed duo were hired by G. P. Sippy to work for Sippy Films as resident screenwriters. They produced the screenplays for several successful films like Andaz, Seeta Aur Geeta, Sholay and Don. Their first big success was the script for Andaz, followed by Adhikar (1971), Haathi Mere Saathi and Seeta Aur Geeta (1972). They also had hits in Yaadon Ki Baaraat (1973), Zanjeer (1973), Haath Ki Safai (1974), Deewaar (1975), Sholay (1975), Chacha Bhatija (1977), Don (1978), Trishul (1978), Dostana (1980), Kranti (1981), Zamana (1985) and Mr. India (1987). They have worked together in 24 films including two Kannada films – Premada Kanike and Raja Nanna Raja. Of the 24 films they wrote 20 were hits. The scripts they wrote but which were not successful at box office include Aakhri Dao (1975), Immaan Dharam (1977), Kaala Patthar (1979) and Shaan (1980). Though they split in 1982, due to ego issues, some of the scripts they wrote were made into films later like Zamana and Mr. India which became successful. Salim-Javed, many a time described as "the most successful scriptwriters of all-time", are also noted to be the first scriptwriters in Indian cinema to achieve star status.

The Salim-Javed duo were also notable for causing several changes to be made in the way scriptwriters were perceived and treated within the Hindi film industry. Until the 1970s, there was no concept of having the same people write screenplay, story and dialogue. Nor were writers usually named in the credits of the film; junior, struggling writers in particular were simply paid and sent away. Salim-Javed changed this situation. Since their scripts were so successful, they had the power to make demands on film-makers. They not only insisted on being paid much more than what had been the norm until then, but also ensured that their name was on the film credits, and also that they were involved at many stages of the process, including screenplay and dialogues.

While credited under the name "Salim-Javed", the screenplay of Zanjeer was almost entirely written by Salim Khan alone, before bringing Javed Akhtar on board and crediting it under the name "Salim-Javed". Salim Khan was also instrumental in launching the career of Amitabh Bachchan, who was a struggling actor before being discovered by Salim-Javed, who were impressed by his acting abilities and insisted on casting him in the lead roles for their films. Salim Khan was also personally responsible for introducing Bachchan to directors such as Prakash Mehra and Manmohan Desai.

Later years (1983–2003) 
Salim Khan, after splitting, from Javed wrote script and dialogues for successful movies like Angaaray (1986), Naam (1986), Kabzaa (1988) and Jurm (1990). For Angaaray, Rajesh Khanna asked director Rajesh Sethi to go to Salim Khan and rework on the script he had.

Salim was not very active in films from 1996 as the fold he wrote like Akayla, Toofan and others between 1988 and 1996 flopped. He wrote scripts for thirteen films from 1983 to 1996, after his split with Javed Akhthar. These included Majdhaar and the hit film Patthar Ke Phool which starred his son Salman Khan. Other notable hits were the scripts for Pyaar Kiya To Darna Kya and Auzaar, both of which were produced by his youngest son Sohail Khan and starred Salman.

His last unofficial partnership with Javed Akhtar was for the film Baghban (2003). Amitabh Bachchan requested to Javed Akhtar to write his final speech. Salman Khan, for his speech prior to that, requested to his father Salim Khan to write his speech. However, neither Salim Khan nor Javed Akhtar were credited.

Personal life 

Khan is married to two women. His first marriage was to Salma Khan (born Sushila Charak), a Hindu, on 18 November 1964. Both of Charak's parents were Hindu: while her father, Baldev Singh Charak, hailed from Jammu, her mother was Maharashtrian. Khan and Salma have four children together; three sons, Salman, Arbaaz and Sohail, and one daughter, Alvira. In 1981, Khan married actress Helen Richardson, a Christian whose father was Anglo-Indian and mother was Burmese. Some years later, they adopted a girl named Arpita, daughter of a homeless woman who died on a Mumbai footpath.

Khan's eldest son, Salman, is one of the most commercially successful actors of Indian cinema. His other two sons, Arbaaz and Sohail, are also actors and film producers. His elder daughter Alvira is married to former actor and film-maker Atul Agnihotri, while his younger daughter Arpita is married to Aayush Sharma, grandson of Sukh Ram, a former Minister of Himachal Pradesh and long-time member of the Congress party. The couple had their first child, a boy, on 30 March 2016. His son, Salman Khan, describes him as a big fan of Kazi Nazrul Islam and is said to have read most of his poems.

Filmography

Actor 
Baraat (1960)
Police Detective (1960)
Ramu Dada (1961)
Professor (1962)
Kabli Khan (1963)
Bachpan (1963)
Darasingh: Ironman (1964)
Aandhi Aur Toofan (1964)
Raaka (1965)
Sarhadi Lutera (1966)
Teesri Manzil (1966)
Sarhaadi Lootera (1966)
Diwana (1967)
Chhaila Babu (1967)
Lahu Pukarega (1968)
Wafadar (1977)

Screenwriter (solo) 
Do Bhai (1969)
Zanjeer  (1973)
Naam (1986)
Angaaray (1986)
Kabzaa (1988)
Toofan (1989)
Jurm (1990)
Akayla (1991)
Mast Kalandar (1991)
Patthar Ke Phool (1991)
Aa Gale Lag Jaa (1994)
Majhdhaar (1996)
Dil Tera Diwana (1996)

Screenwriter (Salim-Javed)

Awards

Filmfare Awards

British Film Institute 
Sholay (1975) was ranked first in the British Film Institute's 2002 poll of "Top 10 Indian Films" of all time.

Honorary awards 
 Lifetime Achievement Honour at Apsara Film & Television Producers Guild Award in January 2014.
 Was due to receive a Padma Shri in 2014 but rejected it saying he deserved a Padma Bhushan at least.

References

External links 

 
 Salim Khan at Bollywood Hungama 
 Salim Khan at Rotten Tomatoes
 Salim-Javed
 An interview with Salim Khan

1935 births
Living people
Indian male screenwriters
Male actors from Indore
Male actors in Hindi cinema
Indian male film actors
Male actors from Mumbai
Indian people of Pashtun descent
20th-century Indian male actors
Hindi screenwriters
20th-century Indian dramatists and playwrights
Writers from Indore
Screenwriters from Madhya Pradesh
Urdu-language writers

20th-century Indian male writers
Salim